Raikküla Parish was an Estonian municipality located in Rapla County. It had a population of 1,754 (as of 1 January 2006) and an area of 224.2 km2.

Settlements
Villages
Jalase - Kaigepere - Keo - Koikse - Kõrvetaguse - Lipa - Lipametsa - Loe - Lõpemetsa - Metsküla - Nõmmemetsa - Nõmmküla - Põlma - Pühatu - Purku - Raela - Raikküla - Riidaku - Tamme - Ummaru - Vahakõnnu - Valli

References

External links